Charles Antenen (3 November 1929 – 20 May 2000) was a Swiss football player, who was nicknamed Kiki.

Career
Antenen played for FC La Chaux-de-Fonds from 1944 to 1952 and 1953–65, winning three Swiss championships and six Swiss Cups. He also played for Lausanne Sports from 1952 to 1953. For the Switzerland national football team, he played 56 matches and scored 22 goals, and took part in three World Cups: 1950, 1954 and 1962.

Titles
 Swiss Champion: 1954, 1955, 1964
 Swiss Cup: 1948, 1951, 1954, 1955, 1957, 1961

References

External links

 

1929 births
2000 deaths
Sportspeople from the canton of Neuchâtel
Swiss men's footballers
1950 FIFA World Cup players
1954 FIFA World Cup players
1962 FIFA World Cup players
Switzerland international footballers
FC Lausanne-Sport players
FC La Chaux-de-Fonds players
FC La Chaux-de-Fonds managers
People from La Chaux-de-Fonds
Association football forwards
Swiss Super League players